Anacithara ione is a species of sea snail, a marine gastropod mollusk in the family Horaiclavidae.

Description
A chaste pale violet species, with occasional brown dorsal shading.  Sometimes, indeed, the ground colour is pale-brown or ochre, while other specimens are pure white The length of the small shell attains 5 mm, its diameter 3 mm. The shell has a thickened fusiform build. It is longitudinally thickly costate, the ribs few in number. The shell contains seven or eight whorls, slightly ventricose, uniformly spirally lirate. The interstices when viewed with a lens are beautifully decussate. The aperture is wide. The outer lip is thickened, transversely striate, as are the whorls. The columellar margin is simple. The short siphonal canal is wide.

Distribution
This marine species occurs off the Loyalty Islands.

References

External links
  Tucker, J.K. 2004 Catalog of recent and fossil turrids (Mollusca: Gastropoda). Zootaxa 682:1–1295.

ione
Gastropods described in 1896